Michael Blum (born May 30, 1993) is an American record producer, singer, songwriter and guitarist. In 2020, he was named an inaugural recipient of ASCAP's Peggy Lee Songwriter Award, and he was named the "Rising Star" guitarist in the 63rd Annual Critics Poll in DownBeat magazine.

Life and career

1993-2011: Early life
Blum was born in Great Neck, New York to a musical family. His father, a classical guitarist, was his first music teacher. Blum began his music studies on piano, then played saxophone before ultimately studying guitar at age nine.

2011-2019: Jazz releases and The Reservoir
In 2011, Blum began studying at Dartmouth College, from which he graduated with a double major in music and cognitive science. During the summer of his freshman year, Blum worked as a pit musician at the New London Barn Playhouse, where he decided to pursue music professionally. He soon began studying with Berklee College of Music professor, Jim Stinnett, who previously taught Blum's father. After studying with him for a year, Stinnett suggested that he and Blum record an album together.

In February 2014, Blum released his debut jazz album, Initiation, with his quartet, which features bassist Jim Stinnett, pianist Brad Smith and drummer Dom Moio. All About Jazz called Initiation a "stellar debut." In a review of Initiation, Downbeat Magazine compared Blum to "Kenny Burrell, Charlie Byrd, Jim Hall, Johnny Smith, Emily Remler...or Columbia-era George Benson," and called Blum "an articulate player who executes with clarity...[and] shows unusual maturity." In a review of Initiation, Vintage Guitar Magazine said, "Hope for jazz guitar's future abounds in this release by the 20-year-old Blum and his quartet…[it's] the perfect debut for a player who seems wise beyond his years."

In June 2015, Blum was named the "Rising Star" guitarist in the 63rd Annual Critics Poll in Downbeat Magazine. That same month, Blum released his second album and vocal debut, Commitment, which features bassist Jim Stinnett, pianist Brad Smith, saxophonist Fred Haas and electric bassist Grant Stinnett. The next year, Blum released Chasin' Oscar: A Tribute to Oscar Peterson, which Downbeat Magazine praised for its "enviable and rare combination of technique and taste." Later in 2016, Blum released Expansion, a jazz fusion project.

In January 2017, Blum released his first jazz-pop album as a singer-songwriter, The Reservoir.

2019-present
In 2019, Blum moved to Los Angeles, CA and began co-writing with and producing for artists including WESLEY, Jenna Lotti, Jake Clark, Sophie Ann and more.

References

External links
 Official Website

1993 births
American jazz musicians
American jazz guitarists
American jazz singers
Jewish American jazz composers
Singers from New York (state)
Jewish American musicians
Dartmouth College alumni
People from Great Neck, New York
Living people
Jewish jazz musicians
Guitarists from New York (state)
Jazz musicians from New York (state)
21st-century American singers
21st-century American guitarists
21st-century American Jews